Saeed Abubakr Zakaria is a Ghanaian Islamic scholar and leader of the Anbariya Islamic Institute in Tamale, Ghana. He is the spiritual leader of Anbariya Sunni Community in Ghana. He succeeded Afa Ajura, who died on December 22, 2004.

Zakaria studied at the Islamic University of Madinah in the 1970s after receiving a scholarship. He returned to the Institute to teach after he graduated in 1985 with a BA in Islamic law and an M.A. in Islamic theology. Zakaria served as an Imam in Canada from 1997 until May 2007, when he returned to Ghana to head the Anbariya Islamic Institute.

See also
Osman Nuhu Sharubutu

References

Living people
Ghanaian imams
Ghanaian Muslims
Ghanaian theologians
Dagomba people
21st-century Muslim scholars of Islam
Sunni Muslim scholars of Islam
Islamic University of Madinah alumni
Ghanaian Islamic religious leaders
21st-century imams
Hanbalis
Year of birth missing (living people)